The 2022 Skyexch SLC Invitational T20 League was a Twenty20 cricket tournament that took place in Sri Lanka from 8 to 15 August 2022. All the matches were played at the R Premadasa International Cricket Stadium, in Colombo. The series was used as preparation for 2022 Asia Cup and the 2022 ICC Men's T20 World Cup. Four teams took part, with the top two sides playing each other in the final.

In the final, SLC Reds beat SLC Blues by 7 wickets to win the tournament. Kusal Mendis was named the player of the match in the final and Asitha Fernando was named the player of the series.

Squads
The following teams and squads were named for the tournament.

Fixtures

Round-robin

Final

References

External links
 Series home at ESPN Cricinfo

SLC Invitational T20 League